Hynek Fajmon (born 17 May 1968 in Nymburk) is a Czech politician who served as a Member of the European Parliament with the Civic Democratic Party between 2004 and 2014, part of the European Democrats, and s oatn
the European Parliament's Committee on Budgets.

He is a substitute for the Committee on Agriculture and Rural Development, a member of the delegation for relations with the People's Republic of China, and a member of Committee on Budgets.

On 27 September 2007, he published an article expressing a favorable view of the U.S. radio detecting base, at the time a very controversial topic in the Czech Republic.

Education
 1992: Master's degree (Faculty of Philosophy and Arts, Charles University, Prague)
 Diplomatic Academy of Vienna
 London School of Economics

Career
 1994-1997: Diplomat
 1998: Adviser on NATO affairs to the Minister of Defence
 since 1991: Member of ODS (Civic Democratic Party)
 since 2001: Member of the ODS executive council
 since 1990: Member of Lysá nad Labem Town Council
 since 1996: Member of Lysá nad Labem Town Board
 1998-2001: Mayor of Lysá nad Labem
 2001-2002: Deputy Mayor of Lysá nad Labem
 2001-2004: Member of the Chamber of Deputies of the Parliament of the Czech Republic
 2001-2004: Member of the Committee for European Integration
 2003-2004: Observer at the European Parliament, member of the Committee on Budgets
 2004-2014: Member of the European Parliament

See also
 2004 European Parliament election in the Czech Republic

References

External links
 
 

1968 births
Living people
Civic Democratic Party (Czech Republic) MEPs
MEPs for the Czech Republic 2004–2009
MEPs for the Czech Republic 2009–2014
People from Nymburk
Charles University alumni